Mais TVI (stylized as +TVI) was a Portuguese digital cable and satellite television channel owned by TVI. The channel provided entertainment programming including TVI originals and international talk-shows.

The channel appeared after an agreement between TVI and NOS, formerly named ZON, on August 1, 2012. In Portugal it has an exclusivity contract with NOS television services, in a similar manner to its sister channel TVI Ficção with MEO. Both channels carry distinct programming.

The channel ended its broadcast on December 1, 2015, with a NOS test card (featuring sound from the Brazilian TV show Pânico na Band, that was broadcasting due to automated continuity).

History

Partnership between TVI and NOS 
On August 1, 2012, +TVI and NOS (formerly ZON) signed a partnership to launch +TVI. It was signed by Rodrigo Costa, ZON's president and Media Capital's CEO Rosa Cullell. It was revealed that the channel would have a post-summer launch and that it would be broadcast in high definition, none of which happened at the time.

The channel was closed on December 1, 2015, due to the launch of another NOS exclusive TVI channel, TVI Reality, according to Media Capital's communications director Helena Forjaz.

The channel kept its exclusivity to its last day.

Shows

Exclusive shows 
On Rec with Paulo Vintém
Tropa do Humor with João Pedro Santos
Dança Com As Estrelas - backstage with Rita Pereira
Pancas da Semana - with Alexandre Santos and NTS

Discontinued exclusive shows 

Spot + with Iva Domingues
 É a Vida, Alvim! with Fernando Alvim
 Video Pop with Leonor Poeiras and Nuno Eiró
 Tu Cá Tu Lá with Manuel Luís Goucha
 Vox – Em Busca da Comédia with Carlos Moura

Other shows 

 A Tua Cara Não Me É Estranha - backstage
 Guestlist
 Fotografia Total
 Take Off

International Shows 

 101 Ways to Leave a Gameshow
 Love in the Wild
 Wipeout
 The Tonight Show with Jimmy Fallon
 Late Night with Seth Meyers
 Excused
 ET - Entretenimento Total
 ABC do Sexo
 OBESOS - A Transformação Extrema
 The Insider
 Pânico na Band
 The Block
 Comedy Central Roast

TVI replays 

 Perdidos na Tribo
 Fear Factor - Desafio Total
 Uma Canção para Ti
 A Tua Cara não me é Estranha
 Big Brother
 Melhor do que Falecer

Episodes 

 Ele é Ela
 Olá Pai!
 Destino Imortal
 37
 O Dom
 Redenção
 O Amor é um Sonho
 Dias Felizes
 Crianças S.O.S
 Clube das Chaves
 O Bando dos Quatro
 Campeões e Detectives
 Detetive Maravilhas
 Morangos com Açúcar (3rd-9th seasons)

Special broadcasts 

 Festa de Lançamento +TVI
 Concerto I Heart Radio Music
 NOS Air Race Championship

References 

Defunct television channels in Portugal
Television channels and stations established in 2013
Television channels and stations disestablished in 2015
2013 establishments in Portugal
2015 disestablishments in Portugal
Televisão Independente